Friendship is a town in Hot Spring County, Arkansas, United States. The population was 176 at the 2010 census, down from 206 at the 2000 census.

Geography
Friendship is located in southern Hot Spring County at  (34.223845, -93.003182), on high ground half a mile (0.8 km) north of the Ouachita River. U.S. Route 67 passes through the center of town, leading northeast  to Malvern, the county seat, and southwest  to Arkadelphia. Interstate 30 passes just northwest of the town limits, with access from Exit 83. I-30 leads northeast  to Little Rock and southwest  to Texarkana.

Demographics

As of the census of 2000, there were 206 people, 79 households, and 57 families residing in the town. The population density was 280.4 inhabitants per square mile (109.0/km2). The racial makeup of the town was 99.51% White, 0.49% from other races.  1.46% of the population were Hispanic or Latino of any race.

There were 79 households, out of which 32.9% had children under the age of 18 living with them, 64.6% were married couples living together, 6.3% had a female householder with no husband present, and 26.6% were non-families. 22.8% of all households were made up of individuals, and 11.4% had someone living alone who was 65 years of age or older.  The average household size was 2.61 and the average family size was 3.03.

In the town, the population was spread out, with 26.2% under the age of 18, 3.9% from 18 to 24, 30.1% from 25 to 44, 21.8% from 45 to 64, and 18.0% who were 65 years of age or older.  The median age was 37 years. For every 100 females, there were 90.7 males.  For every 100 females age 18 and over, there were 90.0 males.

The median income for a household in the town was $39,792, and the median income for a family was $45,000. Males had a median income of $32,031 versus $15,625 for females. The per capita income for the town was $14,865.  About 11.8% of families and 13.9% of the population were below the poverty line, including 17.8% of those under the age of eighteen and 7.5% of those 65 or over.

Education
It is in the Ouachita School District. Its comprehensive high school is Ouachita High School.

References

Towns in Hot Spring County, Arkansas
Towns in Arkansas